Esteban Andrés Valencia Bascuñán (born 8 January 1972) is a Chilean football manager and former player who played as a midfielder.

Club career
A historical player of Universidad de Chile, in Chile he also played for Provincial Osorno, Deportes Puerto Montt, Palestino and Universidad Católica.

Abroad he played for Colón in Argentina and Persegi Bali in Indonesia at the end of his career, where he faced another Chilean players such as Francisco Rotunno.

International career
Nicknamed "Huevito", Valencia obtained a total number of 48 caps for the Chile national football team, scoring three goals between 1994 and 2001. He made his full international debut on 30 April 1994.

Following his return from Indonesia in 2008, he represented the Chile beach soccer team in the South American Championship, alongside retired professional footballers such as Rodrigo Cuevas, rodrigo Sanhueza,  and Carlos Medina, with Miguel Ángel Gamboa as coach.

Managerial career
After working in the Universidad de Chile youth system, in 2021 he took the challenge of managing the first team as a caretaker after Rafael Dudamel was released. Later, he was confirmed until the end of the 2021 season. After this experience, he assumed as Technical Coordinator for the youth system.

Personal life
He is the father of the professional footballer Esteban Valencia Reyes.

Honours

Club
Universidad de Chile
 Primera División (5): 1994, 1995, 1999, 2000, 2004 Apertura
 Copa Chile (2): 1998, 2000

References

External links

1972 births
Living people
Footballers from Santiago
Chilean footballers
Chilean expatriate footballers
Chile international footballers
1995 Copa América players
1997 Copa América players
1999 Copa América players
Universidad de Chile footballers
Provincial Osorno footballers
Club Atlético Colón footballers
Puerto Montt footballers
Club Deportivo Palestino footballers
Club Deportivo Universidad Católica footballers
Persegi Gianyar players
Chilean Primera División players
Argentine Primera División players
Indonesian Premier Division players
Expatriate footballers in Argentina
Expatriate footballers in Indonesia
Chilean expatriate sportspeople in Argentina
Chilean expatriate sportspeople in Indonesia
Association football midfielders
Chilean football managers
Universidad de Chile managers
Chilean Primera División managers